King's Castle may refer to:
King's Castle, Ardglass, a twelfth century castle in County Down, Northern Ireland
King's Castle, Wells, an Iron Age settlement in central Somerset, England
King's Castle, Wiveliscombe, a Neolithic hillfort in south Somerset, England
King's Castle, Castle Islands Fortifications, Bermuda, the oldest surviving English fortification in the New World
The King's Castle, the only permanent collection of Elvis Presley personal memorabilia in Australia